The 2021 Ulster Senior Club Football Championship was the 53rd instalment of the annual competition organised by Ulster GAA. It is one of the four provincial competitions of the 2021–22 All-Ireland Senior Club Football Championship.

The Ulster club championship returned this year after not being held in 2020 due to the COVID-19 pandemic. Kilcoo from Down were the reigning Ulster champions following their victory in the 2019 final over Donegal's Naomh Conaill.

Kilcoo claimed their second Ulster title after a comfortable win against Fermanagh's Derrygonnelly Harps, who were appearing in their first Ulster final.

Teams
The Ulster championship is contested by the winners of the nine county championships in the Irish province of Ulster. Ulster comprises the six counties of Northern Ireland, as well as Cavan, Donegal and Monaghan in the Republic of Ireland.

Bracket

Preliminary round

Quarter-finals

Semi-finals

Final

Championship statistics

Top scorers
Overall

In a single game

References

Ulster Senior Club Football Championship
2021 in Northern Ireland sport
Ulster Senior Club Championship
Ulster Club SFC